The Ouranos class is a ship class of two coastal tankers used by the Hellenic Navy. The ships are almost identical in size. They were built in 1975–1977 and they were commissioned into the Hellenic Navy in 1977. Their main task is to supply other ships and naval bases of the Hellenic Navy with fuel (Diesel F-76 and JP-5/JP-8) and drinking water.

Ships

References

Auxiliary replenishment ship classes
Auxiliary ships of the Hellenic Navy
Ships built in Greece